Cyperus sordidus is a species of sedge that is native to parts of Mexico.

The species was first formally described by the botanists Carl Borivoj Presl and Jan Svatopluk Presl in 1828.

See also 
 List of Cyperus species

References 

sordidus
Plants described in 1828
Flora of Mexico
Taxa named by Jan Svatopluk Presl
Taxa named by Carl Borivoj Presl